The 1982 German motorcycle Grand Prix was the last round of the 1982 Grand Prix motorcycle racing season. It took place on the weekend of 24–26 September 1982 at the Hockenheimring.

Classification

500 cc

References

German motorcycle Grand Prix
German
Motorcycle